Braine-le-Comte is a city and municipality of Wallonia located in the province of Hainaut, Belgium. 

On January 1, 2018, Braine-le-Comte had a total population of 21,649.

The municipality consists of the following districts: Braine-le-Comte, Hennuyères, Henripont, Petit-Rœulx-lez-Braine, Ronquières, and Steenkerque.

The Ronquières inclined plane at the Canal du Centre is in the municipality of Braine-Le Comte.

History
On August 3, 1692, during the Nine Years War, the French army defeated a joint English-Dutch-German army in the Battle of Steenkerque in the current municipality of Braine-le-Comte.

Postal history 

The Braine-le-Comte post-office opened before 1830. It used postal code 22 with bars (before 1864) and 53 with points (before 1874). The Hennuyères post office opened on 6 November 1865. It used postal code 161 with points (before 1874). The Ronquières post office opened on 10 January 1895.

Postal codes in 1969:
 7198 Ronquières
 7199 Henripont
 7490 Braine-le-Comte
 7491 Steenkerque
 7492 Petit-Rœulx-lez-Braine 
 7498 Hennuyères

Notable people
 Eden Hazard, Belgian international footballer
 Thorgan Hazard, Belgian international footballer
 Kylian Hazard, Belgian international footballer
 Father Damien, a Roman Catholic Saint that attended the College of Braine-le-Comte in 1858

References

External links
 

Cities in Wallonia
Municipalities of Hainaut (province)